Brighton is a town in Northumberland County, Ontario, Canada, approximately  east of Toronto and  west of Kingston. It is traversed by both Highway 401 and the former Highway 2. The west end of the Murray Canal that leads east to the Bay of Quinte is at the east end of the town.

Brighton later developed into primarily an agricultural community, specializing in the farming of apples and production of new apple types. However, in recent years, many of the original orchards in the area have been partially removed, to make way for the steadily growing population, and more profitable agricultural produce, such as wheat, corn and soybeans. In late September, Brighton is host to Applefest, its largest yearly festival.

The Municipality of Brighton (formed on January 1, 2001, through an amalgamation of the former Town of Brighton and Brighton Township) is home to over 12,108 inhabitants, with a higher than average percentage of those retired. This is common, as the quiet, clean and friendly atmosphere of many smaller towns near Lake Ontario tend to draw the elderly as popular places for retirement living.

Presqu'ile Provincial Park, just south of the town centre, is one of Brighton's most popular attractions. The park is noted for bird-watching and other nature-oriented activities.  Memory Junction Railway Museum, located in a former Grand Trunk station, has a collection of rail equipment and memorabilia.

Communities
Besides the town proper of Brighton, the municipality of Brighton comprises a number of villages and hamlets, including the following communities such as Carman, Codrington, Hilton, Spring Valley, Smithfield (partially); Butler Creek, Cankerville, Cedar Creek, Gosport, Orland, Presqui'le Point, Wade Corners.

History

The village of Brighton was incorporated on January 1, 1859. On December 1, 1980, it became a town.

The original Simpson house, at 61 Simpson Street, was built in 1850.

The artificial island area of Brighton
Part of the current Municipality of Brighton is on a separate artificial island.  This is a consequence of the borders chosen when the Township of Brighton was created in 1851, and the excavation of the Murray Canal across the historic Isthmus of Murray.  The Murray Canal opened in 1889.

Demographics 

Notable residents 
 Eddie Hayward, racehorse trainer who won the Kentucky Derby
Mark Kellogg, Associated Press correspondent killed at the Battle of the Little Bighorn
Gail Vaz-Oxlade, financial writer and television personality. Host of the Slice series Til Debt Do Us Part and Princess.

Media 
 Brighton Independent (Metroland Media Group)
Oldies 100.9 (My Broadcasting)
Edville Gazette (Independently Published)

See also
List of townships in Ontario

References

External links

 

Populated places on Lake Ontario in Canada
Lower-tier municipalities in Ontario
Municipalities in Northumberland County, Ontario